Jody Gerson (born 1961 in Philadelphia) is the Chairman and CEO of Universal Music Publishing Group. Upon assuming the role on January 1, 2015, Gerson became the first female to run a major record company and first chairwoman of a global music company.

Career
Gerson was raised in a Jewish family in the Philadelphia area, where her father owned several nightclubs including the Latin Casino whose performers included artists like Frank Sinatra and Diana Ross. She began her career in music publishing at Chappell Music shortly after graduating from Northwestern University, where she started out making tape copies. After six years at Chappell, she moved to EMI Music Publishing to run the company's east coast office before shifting to head up the company's west coast publishing division in 1991. In January 2008, Gerson left EMI to become US Co-President of Sony/ATV Music Publishing. In 2015, Gerson joined Universal Music Publishing Group (UMPG) as Chairman and CEO. Under her leadership, UMPG's competitive and financial performance improved, growing its revenue 56% and becoming a billion-dollar business. Gerson has also led the signings and extensions of artists and songwriters including the Bee Gees, Elton John, Carly Simon, Bruce Springsteen, Prince, Taylor Swift, Billie Eilish, Rosalia, Alicia Keys, Coldplay, Justin Bieber, Jack White, SZA, Quavo, Ariana Grande, H.E.R., Harry Styles, Jeff Bhasker, Maren Morris, Tierra Whack, Halsey, Demi Lovato, Shawn Mendes, Tobias Jesso Jr., Travis Scott, Joe Jonas, Nick Jonas, Maroon 5, R.E.M., Pearl Jam and Post Malone, and more. In 2016, she also negotiated a deal for UMPG to be the exclusive worldwide publishing administrator for Prince’s entire song catalog.
 
Previous to UMPG, Gerson has signed many successful songwriters throughout her career in music publishing, including Lady Gaga, Norah Jones, Odd Future, Jermaine Dupri, and a then 15-year-old Alicia Keys. Gerson has also played an instrumental role in the careers of Enrique Iglesias, Pharrell Williams, Mac Miller, Pitbull, RedOne, and Dallas Austin, among others.

In addition to her work in music, Gerson produced the movies Drumline and ATL. Drumline is currently being adapted for Broadway. She is also executive producer of VH1's Drumline 2. She is a board member of the National Music Publishers Association.

Recognition
On December 3, 2015, Gerson was named 'Executive of the Year' by Billboard Magazine in its Women in Music 2015 issue. In 2016 she was named "Inspiring Woman of the Year" by the March of Dimes,  and named to the Variety Power of Women L.A. list.  She has appeared on the Billboard Power 100 every year from 2016 to 2022. and 2019. In 2020, she was named by Billboard as "Executive of the Year", becoming the first music publisher and first woman to receive this honor. Gerson will receive the Abe Olman Publisher Award at the 51st annual Songwriters Hall of Fame Induction and Awards Dinner.

Personal life
Gerson is divorced from Seth Swirsky and has three children: Julian (1994), Luke (2002), and Daisy (2004).

References

American music industry executives
Women chief executives
20th-century American Jews
Living people
The Baldwin School alumni
1961 births
21st-century American Jews